Notre Dame Regional High School teaches grades 9 through 12. The school belongs to the Diocese of Springfield-Cape Girardeau Diocese and are served by Franciscan Brothers of Brooklyn.  Notre Dame Regional High School was founded by the School Sisters of Notre Dame.  The school was served by the School Sisters of Notre Dame until July 1, 1999 when Brother David Migliorino became Principal.

Located in Cape Girardeau, Missouri, Notre Dame is a regional Catholic high school with students coming from several communities in Southeast Missouri and Southern Illinois traveling up to 60 miles one way to school. Notre Dame has also served as host to several international students, including students from Japan, China, Indonesia, South Korea, Thailand, Mexico, Spain, Brazil, Germany, and the Philippines. Brother David left Notre Dame in August 2019 to become Principal of St. Anthony's High School (South Huntington, New York) in South Huntington, New York.

History

Boys & Girls Academies 
Before the founding of St. Mary High School, the Catholic youth of this area studied at the historic college of St. Vincent for boys and the Loretta Academy for girls. St. Vincent's College was conducted by the Vincentian Fathers, and the Loretta Academy conducted by the Sisters of Loretta.

St. Mary High School 
The building, which housed St. Mary High School was the first permanent location of St. Francis hospital until 1914. In the spring of 1925, Very Reverend Eberhardt Pruente, V.F. purchased this building at Sprigg and William Streets for $21,000 and renovated it for use as St. Mary High School. On September 1, 1925, the school opened enrolling 7th, 8th grades, and first year high. Sister Mary Francis was the first teacher.

In 1928 the school was accredited by the State of Missouri. The first class graduated June 9, 1929 with eight students. In 1931, the school nearly closed due to the depression, but Mother Jolendis gave the Sisters permission to teach in the school "gratis". The school progressed through the 1930s and 1940s in spite of times of war.

Cape Girardeau Catholic High School to Notre Dame High School 
This building served as St. Mary High School for twenty-nine years before its capacity could not accommodate the enlarging student body. In 1948, Rev. Theon Schoen, then pastor of St. Mary, began plans for a new and larger high school. Land was purchased between Caruthers and Clark Avenue from the Wulfers family for a new Catholic High School. A ground breaking ceremony was held on June 21, 1953 for a new building that would accommodate between 350 and 400 students. The new Cape Girardeau Catholic High School opened on September 13, 1954 with an enrollment of 211 students. The school changed its name to Notre Dame High School in 1960. In 1962 Notre Dame received accreditation from the North Central Association of Secondary Schools and Colleges.

Athletics 
The Notre Dame Boys' Cross Country team won a state championship in 2005.

The Notre Dame Girls' Soccer won a state championship in 2017 and 2019.

Notre Dame Established as a Regional High School 
In 1995 it was determined that the building was no longer serving the needs of the school community and a capital campaign began to construct a new high school off Route K. The new campus opened in August, 1998 on land donated by the James and Wanda Drury Family Trust. The school was built to accommodate 600 students. The school was renamed Notre Dame Regional High School in conjunction with the school's broad enrollment. Today Notre Dame Regional High School is the largest private high school between St. Louis and Memphis. It has grown to an enrollment of over 500 students.

Notes and references

Roman Catholic Diocese of Springfield–Cape Girardeau
High schools in Cape Girardeau County, Missouri
Catholic secondary schools in Missouri
Buildings and structures in Cape Girardeau, Missouri
Educational institutions established in 1925
1925 establishments in Missouri